Virginia "Ginny" Provisiero (May 29, 1923 – May 3, 2010) was an American comics editor. She was one of the main editors for Fawcett Publications.

Early life and career 
Virginia Provisiero was born in Corona, New York on May 29, 1923. She started her career with Fawcett Comics in April 1943. She worked alongside other female editors, such as Jane Magill, Barbara Heyman, and Mercedes Shull. She began by re-writing the Spy Smasher stories. She then continued to edit numerous other comic strips until Fawcett ceased publishing comics in 1953. Provisiero then moved from editing comics to editing magazines. Towards the end of her career in editing, she became a copy editor for United Technical Publishing in Garden City, New York.

Retirement 
After working as an editor for about 25 years, she moved to Florida in 1968 and became an insurance agent for almost 20 years. She moved from Tallahassee, Florida to Crestview in 2004. Along with being an editor, she was also an artist, painter, and member of Our Lady of Victory Catholic Church. She died on May 3, 2010, at the age of 86.

Comics editor 
 Billy Boyd Western
 Golden Arrow
 Hopalong Cassidy (84 issues, 1946–1953)
 Master Comics (133 issues, 1940–1953)
 Nyoka the Jungle Girl (76 issues, 1945–1953)
 Rocky Lane Western (55 issues, 1949–1953)
 Six-Gun Heroes
 Spy Smasher
 Tex Ritter Western
 This Magazine is Haunted (14 issues, 1951–1953)
 Whiz Comics (155 issues, 1940–1953)

Magazine editor 
 Woman's Day
 True Confessions

References

Other links 
1998 Interview with FCA
Obituary - Northwest Florida Daily News

1923 births
2010 deaths
20th-century American artists
20th-century American writers
American women illustrators
American illustrators
American women artists
American female comics artists
Female comics writers
20th-century American women writers
People from Corona, Queens
21st-century American women